Sir (Henry) Keith Watson (22 August 1900 – 13 January 1973) was a Western Australian politician who was the driving force behind the 1930s secession movement in the State.

He was born in Southern Cross to Victorian parents who had emigrated to Western Australia during the 1890s goldrush. Little else is known of his early life other than he was an accountant by profession.

In 1930, Watson became one of the co-founders of the pro-secession Dominion League first as its treasurer and later as secretary.  Watson launched the League's public campaign at His Majesty's Theatre, Perth on 30 July 1930.

He promoted the League through a campaign of pamphlets, newspaper articles and letters to the editors of the major newspapers promoting secession ideals and the need for a referendum on the issue.  The campaign ultimately resulted in a 1933 referendum which was won by a two-thirds majority YES vote, largely as a result of his enthusiastic campaigning.

Oddly, the pro-secessionist Liberals were voted out in the State election which was held at the same time and the new Labor Government headed by new Premier Philip Collier had campaigned to support the retention of the State in the Federation.  Collier managed to dither with a decision on the secession question until 1934 when he appointed a delegation to present the secession petition to London.  Watson joined the delegation with Sir Hal Colebatch, M. L. Moss, K.C. Smith and James MacCallum Smith (MLA and proprietor of The Sunday Times newspaper).  They returned to Perth in 1935 frustrated at the British Parliament's refusal to accept the petition and by 1938 the Dominion League had become inactive.

In the 1948 elections, Watson was elected as a Member of the Legislative Council for the Metropolitan Province.  The seat was previously held by L. B. Bolton who had deceased.  He served in the parliament for the next twenty years until his retirement in 1968 when he was created a Knight Bachelor.

In 1933 Watson was made a vice-president of the National Party (the forerunner to the Liberal Party) and to the Liberal Party in 1948.

He became chairman of the Perth Building Society in 1951.

References

Members of the Western Australian Legislative Council
Separatism in Australia
1900 births
1973 deaths
People from Southern Cross, Western Australia
Liberal Party of Australia members of the Parliament of Western Australia
20th-century Australian politicians